"Defeated" is a song by American rock band Breaking Benjamin. It was released as an airplay-only single on May 12, 2015 from the band's fifth studio album Dark Before Dawn.

Background
According to Chad Childers of Loudwire, the subject matter of the song is about "overcoming obstacles and standing on your own."

Charts

Personnel
Band
 Benjamin Burnley – lead vocals, guitar
 Jasen Rauch – lead guitar
 Keith Wallen – rhythm guitar, backing vocals
 Aaron Bruch – bass guitar, backing vocals
 Shaun Foist – drums

References

2015 singles
Breaking Benjamin songs
Hollywood Records singles
Songs written by Benjamin Burnley
2015 songs
Songs written by Jasen Rauch